Valmorel is a ski resort in the Tarentaise Valley, located in the communes of Les Avanchers-Valmorel and La Léchère, in the Savoie department in the Auvergne-Rhône-Alpes region.

The station was opened in 1976. The domain is connected to the Mauriennaise station at Saint-François-Longchamp and forms the area known as Grand-Domaine.

Resort name
Valmorel is named from the valley of the River Morel, a tributary of the River Isère.

Resort Access
The route to Valmorel passes Albertville on the N90 until the Aigueblanche / La Lèchère / Doucy Tarentaise / Valmorel exit ramp. From there one route goes to Le Bois and continues directly to Val Morel. The other route goes through Doucy Tarentaise and then the hamlets of Raclaz, Villaret and Meiller. The second route passes the small resort of Doucy-Combelouvière which is linked to Valmorel by ski slopes.

Sports

Cycling
The climb was classified as hors catégorie. The stage victory went to Christopher Froome, who beat Alberto Contador and Matthew Busche.

The 2018 Critérium du Dauphiné also had a Stage 5 finish at Valmorel. Dan Martin won this stage ahead of Geraint Thomas, with Thomas taking the yellow jersey.

References

External links

Official English site
Valmorel ski resort guide

Ski areas and resorts in France
Sports venues in Savoie
Tourist attractions in Savoie